Corbin Shires (born 31 December 1997) is an English footballer.

Career
Shires began his career with non-league Hallam and Worksop Town before joining Mansfield Town in August 2014. He made his professional debut on 2 May 2015 in a 2–1 defeat away at Accrington Stanley.

References

External links

1997 births
Living people
Footballers from Sheffield
English footballers
Association football defenders
Hallam F.C. players
Worksop Town F.C. players
Mansfield Town F.C. players
Carlton Town F.C. players
Bradford (Park Avenue) A.F.C. players
English Football League players
National League (English football) players